Jane Lois Ward (born April 30, 1932) is an American former volleyball player. She played for the United States national team at the 1959 Pan American Games, the 1963 Pan American Games, the 1964 Summer Olympics, the 1967 Pan American Games, and the 1968 Summer Olympics. She was born in Buffalo, New York.

References

1932 births
Living people
Olympic volleyball players of the United States
Volleyball players at the 1964 Summer Olympics
Volleyball players at the 1968 Summer Olympics
Volleyball players at the 1959 Pan American Games
Volleyball players at the 1963 Pan American Games
Volleyball players at the 1967 Pan American Games
Pan American Games gold medalists for the United States
Pan American Games silver medalists for the United States
Sportspeople from Buffalo, New York
American women's volleyball players
Pan American Games medalists in volleyball
Medalists at the 1959 Pan American Games
Medalists at the 1963 Pan American Games
Medalists at the 1967 Pan American Games
21st-century American women